Hails is a surname. Notable people with the surname include:

 Julian Hails (born 1967), English footballer and teacher
 Robert Hails (1923–2012), United States Army Air Forces pilot
 William Hails (1766–1845), English writer

See also
 Hail (disambiguation)
 Hals (surname)